Herman "Kay" Kamen (born Herman Samuel  Kominetzky; January 27, 1892 – October 28, 1949) was an American merchandising executive, noted primarily for his work with the Walt Disney Company. He promoted Mickey Mouse – the most popular cartoon character of the early 1930s.

Early life
Kamen was born January 27, 1892, in Baltimore, Maryland to Russian-Jewish parents, and spent his early life working as a merchant and an advertising man. Kamen was the youngest of four children. He did not finish high school and spent time in a juvenile penitentiary. His first work was selling mink hats in Nebraska in his twenties. He appeared to be a good salesman.

Career
In his thirties Kamen founded a marketing company based in Kansas City, Missouri. The company's specialization was developing products based on movies and negotiation of merchandising agreements for a number of prominent animated figures.

In 1932, Kamen contacted Walt and Roy O. Disney with a proposal to handle licensing of their characters. They were receptive and invited him to come to the studio and make a presentation. Sensing a major opportunity, Kamen immediately withdrew his life savings from the bank and sewed the money into his coat for the two-day train trip to Los Angeles the same day and stayed awake for the entire trip for fear of having his coat stolen. Upon arriving at the Disney Brothers' office, Kamen spread the money on their desk and promised them that amount plus 50% of the revenue he would generate with the merchandising license. 

As a result, Kamen (although briefly delayed by him falling asleep while the Disneys were privately conferring over the offer) secured the licensing agreement for all Disney merchandising, a contract his firm would hold for the next two decades.  Kamen's firm quickly monetized Mickey Mouse's image, providing a much-needed line of cash to the struggling Disney firm through its Walt Disney Enterprises division.  The following year, Kamen's firm developed the Mickey Mouse watch, which was produced by Ingersoll-Waterbury and soon became the bestselling watch in the United States.  By 1948, revenue of licensed Disney products totaled more than $100 million.  Kamen and WDE developed product lines for many of Disney's films and franchises, particularly Snow White and the Seven Dwarfs.  Kamen died in the 1949 Air France Lockheed Constellation crash on São Miguel Island, in the Azores.

References

Further reading
Didier Ghez. "The Man With the Golden Touch". Disney Twenty Three (Spring 2012), pp.22-26.

1892 births
1949 deaths
Accidental deaths in Portugal
American advertising executives
Disney people
Businesspeople from Baltimore
Victims of aviation accidents or incidents in Portugal
Victims of aviation accidents or incidents in 1949